Pachyberis is a genus of flies in the family Stratiomyidae.

Distribution
Madagascar.

Species
Pachyberis stigmaticalis James, 1975

References

Stratiomyidae
Brachycera genera
Diptera of Africa
Endemic fauna of Madagascar